Malian films include:

A
 Afrodita, el jardín de los perfumes (1998)

B
 Bamako (2006)

G
 La genèse (1999)
 Guimba, un tyran, une époque (1995), a.k.a. Guimba the Tyrant

K 

 Kennis Voor Het Leven (2005)

L
 La Vie Sur Terre (1998) (also known as "Life on Earth")

T
 Ta Dona (1991)
 Tell Me Who You Are (2009)

W
 Waati (1995)
 The Wind (1982 - also known as Finye)

Y
 Yeelen (1987) (also known as Brightness)

See also

References 

Malian films
 
Films